The 1983 Grand Prix International 1000 km was the second round of the 1983 World Sportscar Championship and 1983 European Endurance Championship. It took place at the Silverstone Circuit, Great Britain on 8 May 1983. The event was won by the No. 2 Rothmans Porsche Porsche 956 driven by Derek Bell and Stefan Bellof.

Race results
Class winners in bold.

References

Silverstone
Silverstone
6 Hours of Silverstone
May 1983 sports events in the United Kingdom